Mount Tom is a summit in Herkimer County, New York in the Adirondack Mountains. It is located southeast of Little Rapids in the Town of Webb. Twitchell Mountain is located west and Sugarloaf is located south-southeast of Mount Tom.

References

Tom
Tom